The Complete Stories is a discontinued series intended to form a definitive collection of Isaac Asimov's short stories and novels. Originally published in 1990 (Volume 1) and 1992 (Volume 2) by Doubleday, it was discontinued after the second book of the planned series. Altogether 88 of Asimov's 383 published short stories are collected in these two volumes.

Volume 1

The first volume consists of the stories previously collected in Earth Is Room Enough, Nine Tomorrows, and Nightfall and Other Stories (but not the commentary from Nightfall and Other Stories). In 2001, Broadway Books published a new edition of the first volume (hardback: ,).

Volume One contains the following short stories:
 The Dead Past
 The Foundation of S. F. Success
 Franchise
 Gimmicks Three
 Kid Stuff
 The Watery Place
 Living Space
 The Message
 Satisfaction Guaranteed
 Hell-Fire
 The Last Trump
 The Fun They Had
 Jokester
 The Immortal Bard
 Someday
 The Author's Ordeal
 Dreaming Is a Private Thing
 Profession
 The Feeling of Power
 The Dying Night
 I'm in Marsport Without Hilda
 The Gentle Vultures
 All the Troubles of the World
 Spell My Name with an S
 The Last Question
 The Ugly Little Boy
 Nightfall
 Green Patches
 Hostess
 Breeds There a Man…?
 C-Chute
 In a Good Cause—
 What If—
 Sally
 Flies
 Nobody Here But—
 It's Such a Beautiful Day
 Strikebreaker
 Insert Knob A in Hole B
 The Up-to-Date Sorcerer
 Unto the Fourth Generation
 What Is This Thing Called Love?
 The Machine That Won the War
 My Son, the Physicist
 Eyes Do More Than See
 Segregationist
 I Just Make Them Up, See!
 Rejection Slips

Volume 2

Volume Two contains short stories previously published in several other anthologies:

 Not Final!
 The Hazing
 Death Sentence
 Blind Alley
 Evidence
 The Red Queen's Race
 Day of the Hunters
 The Deep
 The Martian Way
 The Monkey's Finger
 The Singing Bell
 The Talking Stone
 Each an Explorer
 Let's Get Together
 Pâté de Foie Gras
 Galley Slave
 Lenny
 A Loint of Paw
 A Statue for Father
 Anniversary
 Obituary
 Rain, Rain, Go Away
 Star Light
 Founding Father
 The Key
 The Billiard Ball
 Exile to Hell
 Key Item
 Feminine Intuition
 The Greatest Asset
 Mirror Image
 Take a Match
 Light Verse
 Stranger In Paradise
 . . . That Thou Art Mindful of Him
 The Life and Times of Multivac
 The Bicentennial Man
 Marching In
 Old-fashioned
 The Tercentenary Incident

Volume 3

Coming soon : 09 November 2023

ISBN: 978-0-00-861052-4

See also
 Isaac Asimov short stories bibliography

References

External links

 Review of Volume 1 at Asimovreviews.net
 Review of Volume 2 at Asimovreviews.net

Complete Stories
Complete Stories
Complete Stories, The
Doubleday (publisher) books